Kistler is a surname. Notable people with the surname include:

 Cyrill Kistler (1848–1907), German composer
 Darci Kistler, American ballerina
 Lynton Richards Kistler (1897–1993), American master printmaker, small book publisher, and author
 Rives Kistler, American judge
 Stefan Kistler (1900–?), German soldier and skier, competitor in the 1928 Winter Olympics (military patrol)
 Steven Kistler, American scientist, inventor of aerogels
 Walter Kistler, Swiss physicist and inventor

German-language surnames